Paulo Caicedo (born 6 October 1969) is an Ecuadorian former cyclist. He competed in the men's individual road race at the 1996 Summer Olympics.

References

External links
 

1969 births
Living people
Ecuadorian male cyclists
Olympic cyclists of Ecuador
Cyclists at the 1996 Summer Olympics
Place of birth missing (living people)